Catatrama is a fungal genus in the family Amanitaceae, order Agaricales. Originally a monotypic genus with Catatrama costaricensis, found in Quercus pilarius forest in Costa Rica. In 2007, the species was reported from Brazil. Since then 2 additional species, one from Australia and one from India have been recognized.

See also
 List of Agaricales genera

References

External links
 

Amanitaceae
Fungi of Central America
Fungi of South America
Monotypic Agaricales genera